Mossley West railway station is located in the townland of Ballyhenry in the north of Newtownabbey, County Antrim, Northern Ireland, owned and operated by NI Railways, a subsidiary of Translink.

In 2008, the station was refurbished as part of a £17 million investment package by NI Railways to improve access for disabled passengers and provide better lighting, signage, and seating.

 is technically the next stop on the line, however, two services each way stop here in accordance with the current timetable. At other times, trains only call at Yorkgate prior to Lanyon Place, hence missing out Whiteabbey.

Service

In the other direction, there is an hourly service to Great Victoria Street.

Railway stations in County Antrim
Railway stations opened by NI Railways
Railway stations served by NI Railways
Newtownabbey
Railway stations opened in 2001
2001 establishments in Northern Ireland
Railway stations in Northern Ireland opened in the 21st century